"Rude" is the debut single by Canadian band Magic! from their debut studio album, Don't Kill the Magic. It was originally released on October 11, 2013, as a promotional single and then re-released on February 24, 2014, by Sony Music Entertainment. The official remix for the song features Kid Ink and Ty Dolla Sign, with fellow Blink-182 member Travis Barker on the drums.

"Rude" was an international commercial success amidst mixed reception from music critics. The song peaked at number six on the Canadian Hot 100 and internationally topped the charts in the United States and the United Kingdom and peaked within the top ten of the charts in Australia, New Zealand, Ireland, Denmark, the Netherlands, and Sweden. "Rude" was the ninth best-selling song of 2014, with global sales of 8.6 million units, and won the Juno Award for Single of the Year.

Background and composition

"Rude" was written by Nasri, Adam Messinger, Mark Pellizzer, Ben Spivak, and Alex Tanas, and produced by Adam Messinger. According to the sheet music published by Sony/ATV Music Publishing at Musicnotes.com, "Rude" is a reggae fusion song set in common time with a tempo of 144 beats per minute. This song is written in the key of B minor.

"Rude" was named after the reggae term "rude boy" and originally based on a real-life situation. The lead singer of Magic!, Nasri, had been in an unhealthy relationship with a previous girlfriend. After the two of them got into a fight with each other, the band based the song off that headline. The couple was in a "mean time" when they were both being rude to each other, as Nasri says in what he describes as a "dark vibe".

Critical reception
Critical reviews for "Rude" have been mixed. 4Music complimented the song, saying: "One listen and you'll be hooked." An article in Psychology Today drew a connection between the lyrics of the song and social attitudes about interracial relationships, while Time magazine named "Rude" the tenth-worst song of 2014, criticizing its "sanitized reggae-fusion sound" and lyrics. Renowned for Sound gave "Rude" a 4 out of 5 star rating, calling the track "lighthearted fun."

Music video
The music video features the band singing the song in a garage while scenes show Nasri in a relationship with a woman played by model Ayla Parker. After this, Nasri asks her conservative father, played by actor Brian Knudson, for her hand in marriage, but the father refuses and won't explain why. The mother, played by actress Mary Kay McCartney, is somewhat softer. Eventually, Nasri secretly proposes to her and together with the rest of the band, try to convince the father, but he still refuses. Nasri marries her anyway and all party in the garage as Parker proclaims her love for Nasri and she abandons her overprotective father's house once and for all. The video was released on the band's YouTube account on December 5, 2013. As of January 2023, the video has over 2.3 billion views on YouTube, and is one of the top 70 most viewed videos on the site.

Live performances and covers
On December 9, 2013, the band made their Australian television debut on Sunrise, where they performed "Rude". In June 2014, the band performed an acoustic version of the song on On Air with Ryan Seacrest. In July, they performed it on The View and on The Tonight Show Starring Jimmy Fallon. On August 10, 2014, the band performed the song at the 2014 Teen Choice Awards. Magic! and American singer Marc Anthony performed a Spanglish version of the song at the 15th Latin Grammy Awards ceremony in 2014 with Anthony singing parts of the song in Spanish.

In September 2014, 15ECONDS (now Aviwkila) performed the song on Rising Star Indonesia. Their performance got a 94% approval rating from viewers.

On July 15, 2015, Postmodern Jukebox released a cover version of the song on YouTube, featuring Von Smith.

In September 2015, American singer Selena Gomez covered the song on BBC Radio 1's Live Lounge.

Track listing

Zedd remix
On 2 September 2014, Russian-German DJ and record producer Zedd released a remix of the song through Sony Music Entertainment lasting 4 minutes and 33 seconds.

Chart performance
"Rude" entered the US Billboard Hot 100 at number 97 on May 10, 2014. On the issue dated July 26, 2014, the song reached number one, marking their first and only number-one single. "Rude" spent six consecutive weeks at number one. On the chart issue dated September 6, 2014, the song tumbled from number one to number 5 on the Hot 100 as Taylor Swift's "Shake It Off" debuted atop the chart. This is the first time since The Black Eyed Peas' "I Gotta Feeling" that a song fell all the way to the number 5 spot after spending as many as six weeks atop the chart. The song spent 16 weeks in the chart's top 10. Magic! is the sixth Canadian band to top the Billboard Hot 100, the first since Nickelback with "How You Remind Me" in 2001. It is also the ninth reggae song to reach the summit, the last being Sean Paul's "Get Busy" in 2003.

"Rude" reached number two on the Billboard Hot Digital Songs on June 18, 2014, selling 207,000 digital copies. The following week the song peaked at number one, selling 210,000. It is only the second reggae song to top the Billboard Hot Digital Songs, after Sean Kingston's "Beautiful Girls" in 2007. The song was certified three-times Platinum by the RIAA in September 2014 and has sold 3 million copies in the US, as of January 2015.

"Rude" peaked at number six on the Canadian Hot 100 and remained on the chart for 69 weeks. In Australia, "Rude" peaked at number two on the Australian Singles Chart. In New Zealand, the song peaked at number two on the New Zealand Singles Chart. In the United Kingdom, "Rude" debuted at number 50 on the UK Singles Chart on July 20, 2014 ― for the week ending date July 26, 2014 ― before climbing to number two a week later. The song topped the chart on August 3, 2014 ― for the week ending date August 9, 2014 ― becoming Magic!'s first chart-topper in Britain. The song peaked at number two in Ireland.

Charts

Weekly charts

Year-end charts

Decade-end charts

All-time charts

Certifications

Release history

See also
List of Billboard Adult Contemporary number ones of 2014

References

Certification Table Entry usages for Australia
Certification Table Entry usages for Canada
Certification Table Entry usages for New Zealand
Certification Table Entry usages for Sweden
Certification Table Entry usages for United Kingdom
Certification Table Entry usages for United States
2013 songs
2013 debut singles
2014 singles
Magic! songs
Billboard Hot 100 number-one singles
Number-one singles in Poland
Number-one singles in Scotland
UK Singles Chart number-one singles
Juno Award for Single of the Year singles
Songs written by Nasri (musician)
Songs written by Adam Messinger
Songs written by Mark "Pelli" Pellizzer
Songs about marriage
RCA Records singles